The Badger Building, or M. Tidyman Building, is a historic office building in downtown Racine, Wisconsin. It is an example of Prairie style architecture, and was designed by prominent Racine architect Edmund Bailey Funston. The site was added to the National Register of Historic Places on December 3, 1980.

History
The four-story brick and concrete structure was built in 1915, to house the Tidyman Candy Company, owned by confectioner Melvin Tidyman. At the time, the Racine Journal-News reported that its construction cost $55,000. During World War I, the building was used by the American Red Cross. It was purchased by attorney Joseph Muratore in 1964, and as of 2015 was owned by his son Joseph Jr. The building continues to be used primarily as office space, most prominently for graphic design firm Image Management.

See also
National Register of Historic Places listings in Racine County, Wisconsin

References

Buildings and structures in Racine, Wisconsin
Office buildings on the National Register of Historic Places in Wisconsin